Al Quinto Día (English: "On The Fifth Day") is the fifth studio album by Peruvian singer-songwriter Gian Marco released by BMG and Ariola Records in 1997. It was released just one year after his previous album Señora, Cuénteme and was also his last album to be released only in Perú as an independent artist.

Background and release
Gian Marco stated that every song in the album is a way of him narrating his story over the past 10 years he had been a musician. The album had success in Perú where it was certified gold and also had success in Colombia where it was praised for its ballad pop songs. This was his last album released nationally before he left Perú and moved to the United States in order to further his career.

Track listing
All credits adapted from Discogs.

Certifications and Sales

References

Gian Marco albums
1997 albums
Spanish-language albums